The Northern League was a name used by several minor league baseball organizations that operated off and on between 1902 and 1971 in the upper midwestern United States and Manitoba, Canada. The name was later used by the independent Northern League from 1993 to 2010.

Incarnations
The Northern League name represented four leagues in this time frame:

First Northern League: 1902–1905
Northern-Copper Country League 1906–1907
Second Northern League: 1908
Minnesota–Wisconsin League 1909–1911
Central International League 1912
Third Northern League: 1913–1917
Fourth Northern League: 1933–1971 (suspended operations 1943–1945 due to World War II)

Historical overview

The first Northern League operated between 1902 and 1905. Charter members were the Winnipeg Maroons, Crookston Crooks, Fargo, Devil's Lake, Grand Forks and Cavalier.

In 1906, the league merged with the Copper Country Soo League to become the Northern-Copper Country League (1906–1907). A second Northern League was attempted in 1908, but did not finish its first season. The third Northern League appeared when the Central International League of 1912 expanded and changed its name in 1913. This third Northern League would last until 1917, when it was forced to disband due to a lack of players as a result of World War I.

The league did not re-emerge until 1933, when it began play with the Brainerd Muskies, Brandon Grays, Crookston Pirates, East Grand Forks Colts, Eau Claire Cardinals, Fargo-Moorhead Twins, Superior Blues and Winnipeg Maroons. The league did not operate between 1943 and 1945 because of a lack of manpower during World War II, and finally folded again in 1971.

While the Northern League in its various incarnations began as an independent loop in 1902, it was Class D (1903–1905, 1908, 1917, 1933–1940) and Class C (1913–1916, 1941–1942, 1946–1962) under the antiquated classification system for Minor League Baseball. The league operated as Class A (1963–1971) under the modern minor league classification system. When the league folded after the 1971 season, the remaining teams were the Aberdeen Pheasants, Sioux Falls Packers, St. Cloud Rox and Watertown Expos.

League Champions

1902 Winnipeg Maroons
1903 Winnipeg Maroons
1904 Duluth White Sox
1905 Duluth White Sox
1906 Calumet Aristocrats (NCCL)
1907 Winnipeg Maroons (NCCL)
1908 Brandon Angels
1909 Duluth White Sox (MWL)
1910 Eau Claire Commissioners (MWL)
1911 Superior Red Sox (MWL)
1912 Duluth White Sox (CIL)
1913 Winona Pirates
1914 Duluth White Sox
1915 Fargo-Moorhead Graingrowers
1916 Winnipeg Maroons
1917 Fargo-Moorhead Graingrowers
1918–1932 league did not operate
1933 Superior Blues
1934 Fargo-Moorhead Twins
1935 Winnipeg Maroons
1936 Eau Claire Bears
1937 Duluth Dukes
1938 Duluth Dukes
1939 Winnipeg Maroons
1940 Grand Forks Chiefs
1941 Eau Claire Bears
1942 Winnipeg Maroons
1943–1945 league did not operate
1946 St. Cloud Rox
1947 Sioux Falls Canaries
1948 Grand Forks Chiefs
1949 Aberdeen Pheasants
1950 Sioux Falls Canaries
1951 Grand Forks Chiefs
1952 Superior Blues
1953 Fargo-Moorhead Twins
1954 Fargo-Moorhead Twins
1955 St. Cloud Rox
1956 Duluth-Superior White Sox
1957 Winnipeg Goldeyes
1958 Fargo-Moorhead Twins
1959 Winnipeg Goldeyes
1960 Winnipeg Goldeyes
1961 Aberdeen Pheasants
1962 Eau Claire Braves
1963 Grand Forks Chiefs
1964 Aberdeen Pheasants
1965 St. Cloud Rox
1966 St. Cloud Rox
1967 St. Cloud Rox
1968 St. Cloud Rox
1969 Duluth-Superior Dukes
1970 Duluth-Superior Dukes
1971 St. Cloud Rox

Source:

Cities represented

1902–1905

 Cavalier, ND: Cavalier 1902 ** Disbanded on July 21, 1902. 
 Crookston, MN: Crookston Crooks 1902–1905 
 Devils Lake, ND: Devil's Lake 1902 ** Disbanded on July 21, 1902.
 Duluth, MN: Duluth White Sox 1903–1905
 Fargo, ND: Fargo 1902–1905
 Grand Forks, ND: Grand Forks Forkers 1902–1905
 St. Cloud, MN & Brainerd, MN: St. Cloud-Brainerd 1905 ** Moved to Superior on June 25, 1905.
 Superior, WI: Superior Longshoremen 1903–1905 ** The first Longshoremen team disbanded August 8, 1903. The third Longshoremen was the relocated St. Cloud-Brainerd franchise, which moved on June 25, 1905.
 Winnipeg, MB: Winnipeg Maroons 1902–1905

1908

 Brandon, MB: Brandon Angels 1908
 Duluth, MN: Duluth White Sox 1908
 Fargo, ND: Fargo Browns 1908 
 Winnipeg, MB: Winnipeg Maroons 1908

1913–1917 

 Duluth, MN: Duluth White Sox 1913–1916
 Fargo, ND & Moorhead, MN: Fargo-Moorhead Graingrowers 1914–1917 
 Fort William, Ontario: Fort William Canadians 1914–1915
 Fort William, Ontario & Port Arthur, Ontario: Fort William-Port Arthur Canadians 1916 ** Withdrew July 10, 1916.
 Grand Forks, ND: Grand Forks Flickertails 1913–1915
 The team withdrew from the league on July 5, 1915.
 LaCrosse, WI: LaCrosse Colts 1913 ** Moved from St. Paul July 23, 1913.
 Minneapolis, MN: Minneapolis Millers 1913
 Minot, ND: Minot Why Nots 1917
 St. Boniface, MB: St. Boniface Bonnies 1915
 St. Paul, MN: St. Paul Colts 1913 ** Moved to LaCrosse July 23, 1913.
 Superior, WI: Superior Red Sox 1913–1915 ** Withdrew July 5, 1915.
 Virginia, MN: Virginia Ore Diggers 1913–1916 ** Withdrew July 10, 1916.
 Warren, MN: Warren Wanderers 1917
 Winnipeg, MB: Winnipeg Maroons 1913–1917
 Winona, MN: Winona Pirates 1913–1914

1932–1971 

Aberdeen, SD: Aberdeen Pheasants 1946–1971
Bismarck, ND & Mandan, ND: Bismarck-Mandan Pards 1962–64; Bismarck-Mandan Pards 1966 
Brainerd, MN & Little Falls, MN: Brainerd Muskies 1933; Brainerd-Little Falls Muskies 1934; Brainerd Blues 1935 
Brandon, MB: Brandon Grays 1933 
Crookston, MN: Crookston Pirates 1933–1941 
Duluth, MN: Duluth White Sox 1934 Duluth Dukes 1935–1942, 1946–1955 
Duluth, MN & Superior, WI: Duluth-Superior White Sox 1956–1959; Duluth-Superior Dukes 1960–1970 
East Grand Forks, MN: East Grand Forks Colts 1933 
Eau Claire, WI: Eau Claire Cardinals 1933; Eau Claire Bears 1934–1942, 1946–1953; Eau Claire Braves 1954–1962 
Fargo, ND & Moorhead, MN: Fargo-Moorhead Twins 1933–1942, 1946–1960 
Grand Forks, ND: Grand Forks Chiefs 1934–35; Grand Forks Chiefs 1938–1942, 1946–1963; Grand Forks Dodgers 1964 
Huron, SD: Huron Phillies 1965–1968; Huron Cubs 1969–1970 
Jamestown, ND: Jamestown Jimmies 1936–1937 
Mankato, MN: Mankato Mets 1967–1968 
Minot, ND: Minot Mallards 1958–1960; Minot Mallards 1962 
St. Cloud, MN: St. Cloud Rox 1946–1971 
Sioux Falls, SD: Sioux Falls Canaries 1942, 1946–1953; Sioux Falls Packers 1966–1971 
Superior, WI: Superior Blues 1933–1942, 1946–1955 
Watertown, SD: Watertown Expos 1970–1971 
Wausau, WI: Wausau Lumberjacks 1936–1939; Wausau Timberjacks 1940–1942; Wausau Lumberjacks 1956–1957 
Winnipeg, MB: Winnipeg Maroons 1933–1942; Winnipeg Goldeyes 1954–1964; Winnipeg Goldeyes 1969

References

Ballparkwatch Northern League history
An Informal History of the Northern League by Herman D. White

Defunct professional sports leagues in the United States
Defunct minor baseball leagues in the United States
Sports leagues established in 1902